Potato vine may apply to 

 several plant species of  the genus Solanum.
 Solanum crispum, also called  Chilean potato vine
 Solanum laxum, (Solanum jasminoides) also called Jasmine nightshade
 Solanum wendlandii, also called Giant potato vine or Divorce vine
 some Dioscorea species